Otacílio Neto means Otacílio, the grandson, may refer to:
Otacílio Mariano Neto, (born 1982), Brazilian footballer
Otacilio Jales da Silva Neto, (born 1984), Brazilian footballer

See also
Otacilio
Neto (suffix)